Metropolitan Anthony of San Francisco was the first Metropolitan Bishop of the Greek Orthodox Metropolis of San Francisco, a metropolis of the Greek Orthodox Archdiocese of America, under the spiritual authority of the Ecumenical Patriarch of Constantinople. His first bishopric was that of the Eighth Archdiocesan District of the Greek Orthodox Archdiocese with headquarters in Denver, Colorado. He was subsequently enthroned as Bishop Anthony of San Francisco as the first bishop of the newly formed Greek Orthodox Diocese of San Francisco. He became titular Metropolitan of the Dardanelles, but retained leadership of the diocese. When diocese was elevated to the status of Metropolis of San Francisco, Metropolitan Anthony was named the Greek Orthodox Metropolitan of San Francisco.

Education
Anthony Gergiannakis (b. Avgeniki, Crete, Greece, March 2, 1935), after basic elementary education, entered the Ecclesiastical School of Agia Trias (Holy Trinity) in Chania, Crete. Upon completion, he went to the renowned Halki seminary of the Ecumenical Patriarchate, where he received his degree in Orthodox Theology in 1960.

Early career
As a priest, Fr. Anthony served Greek Orthodox parishes in Ansonia, Connecticut (Holy Trinity Church); Chicago Heights, Illinois (Assumption Church); and Madison, Wisconsin (Assumption Church). In 1974, he was named Dean of Saint George Cathedral in Montreal, Quebec, Canada.

Leadership
Anthony set up and expanded a number of programs in the metropolis, including the forming of the annual Greek Folk Dance Festival in various locations. He was involved in education in cultural and religious themes. He was also instrumental in the founding of three Orthodox monasteries in the metropolis: Saint Anthony's Monastery in Florence, Arizona, the Monastery of the Theotokos the Life-Giving Spring in Dunlap, California (where his body is interred), and  Saint John the Forerunner Monastery in Goldendale, Washington.

References

Article "A Reflection on the Life of His Eminence Metropolitan Anthony, 1935-2004", Fr. John Bakas, Dean, St. Sophia Greek Orthodox Cathedral, Los Angeles, California.
10-Year Anniversary of the Passing of Metropolitan Anthony, from the website of the Greek Orthodox Metropolis of San Francisco. Viewed Dec. 11, 2014

1935 births
2004 deaths
Greek emigrants to the United States
Eastern Orthodoxy in California
Religious leaders from the San Francisco Bay Area
Greek Orthodox Christians from the United States
21st-century Eastern Orthodox bishops
Eastern Orthodox metropolitans
Eastern Orthodox bishops in the United States